NextMedia may refer to:
 Next Digital, formerly Next Media, Hong Kong media company
 NextMedia Group, American media company
 nextmedia, Australian publisher